Ivan Balykin (born 26 November 1990) is a Russian racing cyclist, who most recently competed for . He rode at the 2014 UCI Road World Championships.

Major results

2010
 5th Coppa della Pace
2013
 4th Coppa della Pace
 9th Gran Premio Industrie del Marmo
2014
 1st Stage 2 Baltic Chain Tour
 1st  Mountains classification Grand Prix Udmurtskaya Pravda
 3rd Duo Normand (with Artem Ovechkin)
 4th Overall Five Rings of Moscow
 5th Mayor Cup
 9th Gran Premio Bruno Beghelli
2015
 1st Maykop–Ulyap–Maykop
 6th Overall Tour of Estonia
 6th Overall Tour de Serbie
 6th Grand Prix Minsk
 7th Minsk Cup
 9th Overall Five Rings of Moscow
2016
 4th Gran Premio de San José
2017
 Les Challenges de la Marche Verte
1st GP Oued Eddahab
7th GP Sakia El Hamra
9th GP Al Massira
 1st Stage 2 Tour of Ankara
 1st Stage 2b (ITT) Tour of Bihor
 6th Poreč Trophy
 8th Trophée de l'Anniversaire, Challenge du Prince
2018
 2nd Overall Tour of Mevlana
1st Stage 2
 3rd Grand Prix Alanya
 4th Overall Tour of Mesopotamia
1st Stage 2
 4th Overall Tour of Mersin
 6th Overall Belgrade–Banja Luka
 9th Grand Prix Side

References

External links

1990 births
Living people
Russian male cyclists
People from Naberezhnye Chelny
Sportspeople from Tatarstan